Degeorge is a French language surname that stems from the male given name George. Notable people with the name include:

Charles Degeorge (1837–1888), French sculptor, and medallist
Joe DeGeorge (1987), American musician 
Thomas Degeorge (1786–1854), French Neoclassical painter

See also 
 George (surname)

French-language surnames
Surnames from given names